Hernicourt is a commune in the Pas-de-Calais department in the Hauts-de-France region of France.

Geography
A commune made up of three farming villages (Sautricourt, St.Martin and Hernicourt) that surround the neighbouring commune of Wavrans-sur-Ternoise.

Population

Places of interest
 The church of St.Vaast at Hernicourt, rebuilt in the 19th century.
 The medieval church of St.Martin.
 Evidence of an old castle at Sautricourt.
 A watermill.

See also
Communes of the Pas-de-Calais department

References

Communes of Pas-de-Calais